Mount Moroni is a  elevation Navajo Sandstone summit located at the Court of the Patriarchs in Zion National Park, in Washington County of southwest Utah, United States.

Description
It is set alongside the North Fork of the Virgin River which drains precipitation runoff from this mountain. Its neighbors include The Sentinel, Mountain of the Sun, Twin Brothers, Mount Spry, The East Temple, and the Three Patriarchs: peaks Abraham, Isaac, and Jacob. This feature's name was officially adopted in 1934 by the U.S. Board on Geographic Names. It is named for Angel Moroni, who presented Joseph Smith with the golden plates from which he translated and published the Book of Mormon.

Climate
Spring and fall are the most favorable seasons to visit Mount Moroni. According to the Köppen climate classification system, it is located in a Cold semi-arid climate zone, which is defined by the coldest month having an average mean temperature below , and at least 50% of the total annual precipitation being received during the spring and summer.

Climbing Routes

Climbing Routes on Mount Moroni include:
 Road to Cumorah - IV  C1 - 10 pitches
 The Groper - III  - 6 pitches
 Forced Issue - III/IV  R - 9 pitches
 Varco Route - II  - 2 pitches
 Voice From The Dust - III  - 9 pitches
 Plan B - IV  - 9 pitches
 Molecules of Emotion - IV  - 6 pitches
 Crack in the Cosmic Egg - V  C2 - 6 pitches

Gallery

See also

 List of mountains in Utah
 Geology of the Zion and Kolob canyons area
 Colorado Plateau

References

External links

 Zion National Park National Park Service
 Weather: Mount Moroni
 Mount Moroni Rock Climbing: mountainproject.com

Moroni
Moroni
Moroni
Moroni
Moroni